Cavicchioli is a surname. Notable people with the surname include: 

Gino Cavicchioli (born 1957), Canadian sculptor
Marco Cavicchioli (born 1969), Italian politician

Italian-language surnames